Conformastatic spacetimes refer to a special class of static solutions to Einstein's equation in general relativity.

Introduction 

The line element for the conformastatic class of solutions in Weyl's canonical coordinates reads

as a solution to the field equation

Eq(1) has only one metric function  to be identified, and for each concrete , Eq(1) would yields a specific conformastatic spacetime.

Reduced electrovac field equations 

In consistency with the conformastatic geometry Eq(1), the electrostatic field would arise from an electrostatic potential  without spatial symmetry:

which would yield the electromagnetic field tensor  by

as well as the corresponding stress–energy tensor by 

Plug Eq(1) and Eqs(3)(4)(5) into "trace-free" (R=0) Einstein's field equation, and one could obtain the reduced field equations for the metric function :

Linearization of electrovac field equations

Examples

Extremal Reissner–Nordström spacetime 

The extremal Reissner–Nordström spacetime is a typical conformastatic solution. In this case, the metric function is identified as

which put Eq(1) into the concrete form

Applying the transformations

one obtains the usual form of the line element of extremal Reissner–Nordström solution,

Charged dust disks 

Some conformastatic solutions have been adopted to describe charged dust disks.

Comparison with Weyl spacetimes 

Many solutions, such as the extremal Reissner–Nordström solution discussed above, can be treated as either a conformastatic metric or Weyl metric, so it would be helpful to make a comparison between them.  The Weyl spacetimes refer to the static, axisymmetric class of solutions to Einstein's equation, whose line element takes the following form (still in Weyl's canonical coordinates): 

Hence, a Weyl solution become conformastatic if the metric function  vanishes, and the other metric function  drops the axial symmetry:

The Weyl electrovac field equations would reduce to the following ones with :

 
 
 
 

It is also noticeable that, Eqs(14) for Weyl are consistent but not identical with the conformastatic Eqs(6)(7) above.

References

See also 

Weyl metrics
Reissner–Nordström metric

General relativity